The Ministry of National Security can refer to:
Ministry of National Security of Azerbaijan
Ministry of National Security (South Sudan)
Ministry of National Security (Jamaica)
Ministry of National Security (Bahamas)
Ministry for National Security (Turkmenistan)
Ministry of National Security (Israel)
Ministry of National Security (Trinidad & Tobago)
Ministry of National Security (Guyana)
Ministry of National Security (Belize)
Ministry of National Security (Barbados)
Ministry of National Security (Czechoslovakia)
Ministry of National Security (Grenada)
Ministry of National Security (Saint Kitts & Nevis)
Ministry of National Security (Saint Vincent & the Grenadines)
Ministry of National Security and Labour (Antigua & Barbuda)
Ministry of National Security, Immigration and Labour (Dominica)
Ministry of Legal Affairs, Home Affairs and National Security (Saint Lucia)